Euxesta bicolor is a species of ulidiid or picture-winged fly in the genus Euxesta of the family Tephritidae. It was described by Ezra Townsend Cresson in 1906.

References

bicolor
Insects described in 1906
Taxa named by Ezra Townsend Cresson